Diloma zelandicum is a species of sea snail, a marine gastropod mollusc in the family Trochidae, the top snails or top shells.

Description
The height of the shell attains 20 mm, its diameter 25 mm. The imperforate shell is depressed and has an orbiculate-conoidal shape. The six whorls are separated by impressed sutures. The whorls are slightly convex, greenish-black and shining. They are spirally sulcate, the sulci about 5 on the penultimate whorl. The body whorl is much dilated, slightly depressed above, rounded in the middle, very obliquely striate, obsoletely transversely sulcate, slightly convex beneath. The aperture is subrhomboidal and lirate within. The acute lip is green. The basal margin is thickened within. The white columella is compressed and arcuate. The columellar callus is broadly expanded, subdepressed at the place of the umbilicus.

Distribution
This marine species is endemic to New Zealand and occurs off North Island, South Island and Stewart Island. It has also been reported from Tasmania.

References

 Powell A. W. B., New Zealand Mollusca, William Collins Publishers Ltd, Auckland, New Zealand 1979 
 Spencer H.G., Marshall B.A. & Waters J.M. (2009) Systematics and phylogeny of a new cryptic species of Diloma Philippi (Mollusca: Gastropoda: Trochidae) from a novel habitat, the bull kelp holdfast communities of southern New Zealand. Invertebrate Systematics 23: 19–25.

External links
 

zelandicum
Gastropods of New Zealand
Gastropods described in 1834